This article lists the confirmed national football squads for the 18th Arabian Gulf Cup tournament held in UAE between January 17 and January 30, 2007.

Group A

The squad was announced in January 2007 

Head coach:  Hans-Peter Briegel

Coach: Akram Salman

Head coach:



Group B

Head coach: Saleh Zakaria

Head coach:

Head coach:

Head coach:

References 

UAE League Cup seasons